Archips euryplinthus is a species of moth of the family Tortricidae. It is found in India.

The larvae feed on Malus species.

References

Moths described in 1923
Archips
Moths of Asia